Regional Development Bank (RDB;) is a state-owned bank in Sri Lanka.

The bank has a network of 272 service points and 51 automated teller machines (ATMs)/cash deposit machines (CDMs).

References 

1985 establishments in Sri Lanka
Banks of Sri Lanka
Banks established in 1985
State owned commercial corporations of Sri Lanka